Lleyton Hewitt was the defending champion but lost in the quarterfinals to Arnaud Clément.

Sjeng Schalken won in the final 3–6, 6–3, 6–2 against Clément.

Seeds
A champion seed is indicated in bold text while text in italics indicates the round in which that seed was eliminated.

  Lleyton Hewitt (quarterfinals, withdrew because of a stomach virus)
  Roger Federer (quarterfinals)
  Guillermo Cañas (semifinals)
  Tommy Robredo (semifinals)
  Nicolas Escudé (second round, retired because of a stomach muscle injury)
  Sjeng Schalken (champion)
  Arnaud Clément (final)
  Julien Boutter (first round)

Draw

External links
 2002 Ordina Open Draw

Men's Singles
Singles